Francisco Fervenza Fernández (Santander, Spain, August 15, 1907– Valencia, January 13, 1998) was a Cantabrian anarcho-syndicalist.

Biography 
He was born in Santander on August 15, 1907. A metallurgical worker by profession, he became a trade union activist and member of the National Confederation of Labor (CNT).
 
After the outbreak of the Spanish Civil War joined the confederal militias. He commanded a battalion of the CNT that acted in the mountainous area of Cantabria. Later was named commander of the 12th Santanderina Brigade, with which he took part in the War in the North. 

At the end of the war he was arrested in Alicante, being imprisoned. He was moved to Santander, where he was tried and sentenced to death, although his sentence was commuted thanks to favorable testimonies received by civilians and relatives of those who had been saved by him.

He died in Valencia on January 13, 1998.

References

Bibliography 
 
 

1907 births
1998 deaths
Confederación Nacional del Trabajo members
Spanish military personnel of the Spanish Civil War (Republican faction)
People from Cantabria
Spanish anarchists